Stephen Martin Edge (born 29 November 1950) is one of the UK's foremost corporate tax lawyers. He was born and raised in Bolton, Lancashire. After schooling at Canon Slade School he went to Exeter University where he achieved a 2:2 in law. In 1973 he joined Slaughter and May where he has been a partner since 1982.

In 2008, The Times described Edge as the UK’s leading authority on corporate tax law.

He is vice-president of the Lancashire Cricket Federation and a member of the Marylebone Cricket Club.

References

External links
Quoted in The Lawyer

English lawyers
1950 births
People from Bolton
Living people
Tax lawyers
Alumni of the University of Exeter